The 1992 Turkmenistan Higher League (Ýokary Liga) season was the first season of Turkmenistan's professional football league. It started April 25, 1992, and finished November 23, 1992.

The 1992 Ýokary Liga season was composed of the following clubs:

 Ahal Akdaşaýak
 Arkaç Gyzylarbat
 Arlan Nebitdag
 Bereket Tejen
 Hazar Krasnowodsk
 Jeýhun Seýdi
 Kolhozçy Türkmengala
 Köpetdag Aşgabat
 Lebap Çärjew
 Merw Mary
 Nebitçi Nebitdag
 Sport Büzmeýin
 TSHT Aşgabat
 Zarýa-MALS Daşhowuz
 Umyt Baýramaly

Results

Ýokary Liga seasons
Turk
Turk
1992 in Turkmenistani football